The 2004–05 Paktel Cup was a three-team One Day International men's cricket tournament held in Pakistan in September and October 2004, between the hosting nation's team, Sri Lanka and Zimbabwe. The teams played each other two matches. The top two teams on points went on to play the final.

Group Stage Table

Schedule

Group stage matches

1st Match: Pakistan v Zimbabwe, 30 September

2nd Match: Pakistan v Zimbabwe, 3 October

3rd Match: Pakistan v Sri Lanka, 6 October

4th Match: Sri Lanka v Zimbabwe, 9 October

5th Match: Sri Lanka v Zimbabwe, 11 October

6th Match: Pakistan v Sri Lanka, 14 October

Final

Final match: Pakistan v Sri Lanka, 16 October

References

External links
 Paktel Cup, 2004–05 – Fixtures

2004 in Pakistani cricket
International cricket competitions in 2004–05
Cricket